The MIT Art, Design and Technology University (MIT-ADT) is an autonomous private university in Rajbaug Loni Kalbhor, Pune, Maharashtra, India. It is part of the MIT Group of Institutions.It is a UGC recognized multidisciplinary University and has been bestowed with the 'Best Campus Award' by ASSOCHAM.

History 

The MIT Group of Institutions established a campus in Rajbaug Loni Kalbhor in 2004. The campus was incorporated as a distinct university, MIT-ADT, in June 2016, under the provisions of the MIT Art, Design and Technology University Act, 2015.

Academics 
The institute offers Graduate and Postgraduate level courses, namely Graduate Diploma Program (GDP) Postgraduate Diploma Program (PGDP) in various concentrations. 

Link- https://www.mituniversity.ac.in/academics

Institutes 
 Maharashtra Academy of Naval Education & Training- MANET Founded in 2001. Offers a 4 year B.Tech Marine Engineering course & 3 year B.Sc. Nautical Science course.
 MIT Institute of Design (MITID), founded 2006: Undergraduate and post-graduate programs in industrial, communication and fashion design.
School of Fine Arts & Applied Arts- MITSOFA 
MIT COLLEGE OF MANAGEMENT
SCHOOL OF CORPORATE INNOVATION LEADERSHIP
 MIT International School of Broadcasting and Journalism (MIT-ISBJ), founded 2008: Post-graduate programs in mass communications and journalism.
 MIT School of Engineering:   computer engineering, aerospace engineering, mechatronics engineering, energy engineering, civil engineering, IT engineering and electronic & communication engineering.
 MIT SCHOOL OF FOOD TECHNOLOGY
 MIT VISHWASHANTI SANGEET KALA ACADEMY 
 The School of Film & Television 
 MIT School Of Architecture 
 MIT SCHOOL OF BIO ENGINEERING SCIENCES AND RESEARCH 
 MIT SCHOOL OF INDIAN CIVIL SERVICES
 MIT SCHOOL OF EDUCATION RESEARCH 
 MIT SCHOOL OF VEDIC SCIENCES 
 MIT SCHOOL OF HOLISTIC DEVELOPMENT 
 MIT SCHOOL OF HUMANITIES

Facilities 

We at MIT ADT University understand that the time students spend at the campus is one of the most crucial periods of their life. Together with our faculty members and architectural team we have successfully created a thriving campus where students have a life beyond their books. At our campus students get to learn important life values like discipline and punctuality owing to our one-of-a-kind ‘Gurukul System’.Our campus is a bustling place where we have various clubs and committees to facilitate the creativity of young minds. Various clubs like literature club, corporate relations club, painting club, etc help students to showcase their individualistic creative flair. Moreover, we also organize events like Persona Fest and Vishwanath Sports Meet that further help the students to make the most out of their student life at MIT ADT University. 

 In-house Medical Facility
 Sports Complex 
 Hostels & Guest Houses 
 Cafeteria
 Transport Facility
 Auditoriums & Seminar Halls

Awards 

 2017: Best University campus award by the Associated Chambers of Commerce India (Assocham)

References

External links
Official website

Design schools in India
Universities and colleges in Pune
Educational institutions established in 2006
2006 establishments in Maharashtra